Pishchikhino is a rural locality (a village) in Vtorovskoye Rural Settlement, Kameshkovsky District, Vladimir Oblast, Russia. The population was 19 as of 2010.

Geography 
Pishchikhino is located 23 km southwest of Kameshkovo (the district's administrative centre) by road. Mirny is the nearest rural locality.

References 

Rural localities in Kameshkovsky District